The Order of the Arrow in the Boy Scouts of America, in its focus on service, contains four different high adventure programs at the national level that focus on conservation. They are only open to youth aged 14 to 20, with specific ages varying by program, and are available at a substantially lower price than other programs at the base. They each include a period of service and a trek period during which the participants get to plan their own routes and experience the best of the bases.

Trail Crew

The first program that the Order of the Arrow established is the Trail Crew trek at Philmont Scout Ranch in New Mexico.  The program, started in 1995, is held in multiple sessions every summer.  Each session is a fourteen-day program for Order of the Arrow members aged 16 to 20 that gives participants an opportunity to work on various conservation projects around the ranch. Participants build trail for seven days and then go on a seven-day trek throughout Philmont. Many Order of the Arrow lodges and sections offer scholarships to Order of the Arrow members.

Wilderness Voyage

After the success of the Trail Crew program, the Order of the Arrow established another program following the same model at the Northern Tier National High Adventure Bases in Minnesota. Instead of hiking and backpacking as in Trail Crew, the participants use canoes for transportation. Their work occurs in the Boundary Waters Canoe Area Wilderness in the Superior National Forest. Since its inception, the program has worked on some of the most treacherous portage trails in the area including the notorious Birch to Frog and Ensign to Boot portages. In the summer of 2007, the program did its first work in Canada on the Big Knife portage on the Canada–US border.

Participants aged 16–20 are led by Foremen of the Northern Tier Conservation Department. Participants do conservation service for seven days and then go on a seven-day canoe trip. Crews have traveled all the way to International Falls and the Grand Portage National Monument on Lake Superior in only a week. The program also draws much from the history of the area, as many of the trails were previously maintained by the Civilian Conservation Corps and crews often map their treks around historic routes often including the Height of Land Portage.

In 2003, the program and the Order of the Arrow received the US Forest Service Chief's Volunteer Award for Youth Volunteer Service.

Canadian Odyssey
The Canadian Odyssey Order of the Arrow High Adventure Program began in the summer of 2009. Based at the Northern Tier National High Adventure Bases, this program builds on the success of the Wilderness Voyage program by doing trail work in the Quetico Provincial Park in Ontario. Work crews, composed of Arrowmen aged 16–20, canoe from the base in Atikokan, Ontario to base Ely, Minnesota. As of 2013, the program began working exclusively in the Southern Quetico.

Ocean Adventure

Starting in the summer of 2005, another program was established at the Florida National High Adventure Sea Base in the Florida Keys. This program also has a week of service but, initially, it followed a week during which participants gain PADI SCUBA Certification. The OAOA participants, aged 16–20, provided services such as marine life monitoring for the Reef Environmental Education Foundation, and coral reef conservation for the Florida Keys National Marine Sanctuary. OAOA underwent a program revision in 2010, thus cancelling all OAOA programs for that year, and resumed under the new program in 2011.  Under the new program, participants spend a week providing service to the various parts of the Florida Keys, including a few spaces on the Florida Sea base property, such as Big Munson Island or the Florida Keys Heritage Trail.  The remainder of the time is spent on the water, enjoying the Sea Base program.

In 2017, the Ocean Adventure program began a new chapter of its short history. This new program, based out of Camp Jackson Sawyer, sent participants to Ft. Jefferson at Dry Tortugas National Park. There, scouts work hand-in-hand with NPS maintenance staff to ensure that the Civil War era fort continues to be accessible to its visitors. Fishing, kayaking, and snorkeling in one of the least traveled national parks is what any scout can expect to experience while there.

Summit Experience
With the opening of the Summit Bechtel Family National Scout Reserve for high adventure programming in 2014, the Order of the Arrow developed a program to be held at the Summit Bechtel Reserve.  This program differs from its counterparts in that admission to the program is granted only to those Arrowmen who are between the ages of fourteen and eighteen during the entire trek.  Further, the program is significantly shorter; the program runs for only eight days, as opposed to the fourteen of the other programs.  However, the structure of the program echoes the structure of the Northern Tier and Philmont programs.  For the first four days, participants work on a project in the New River Gorge area; the remaining time on the trek focuses on the various activities that are offered at the Summit Bechtel Reserve, especially around whitewater rafting and kayaking.

See also
 High-adventure bases of the Boy Scouts of America
 Northern Tier National High Adventure Bases
 Florida National High Adventure Sea Base
 Philmont Scout Ranch

References

External links
 Order of the Arrow High Adventure Official Site

Order of the Arrow
Scouting events